The Seafarer 23 Challenger is an American trailerable sailboat that was designed by McCurdy & Rhodes as a cruiser and first built in 1978.

The design is sometimes confused with the similarly named Seafarer 23 and the Seafarer 23 Kestrel.

Production
The design was built by Seafarer Yachts, from 1978 until 1984 in the United States, but it is now out of production.

Design
The Seafarer 23 Challenger is a recreational keelboat, built predominantly of fiberglass, with wood trim. It has a masthead sloop rig, a raked stem, a slightly reverse transom, a skeg-mounted rudder controlled by a tiller and a fixed fin keel or optional shoal-draft keel. It displaces  and carries  of lead ballast.

The boat is normally fitted with a small outboard motor for docking and maneuvering.

The design has sleeping accommodation for five people, with a double "V"-berth in the bow cabin, a straight settee in the main cabin on the port side and slides out to form a double berth and a single berth on the starboard side. The galley is located under the companionway ladder. The galley is equipped with a two-burner stove and a sink. The enclosed head is located just aft of the bow cabin on the port side, or optionally in the bow cabin, under the "V"-berth, to give more room in the main cabin.

See also
List of sailing boat types

References

Keelboats
1970s sailboat type designs
Sailing yachts 
Trailer sailers
Sailboat type designs by McCurdy & Rhodes
Sailboat types built by Seafarer Yachts